51st National Board of Review Awards
February 20, 1980
The 51st National Board of Review Awards were announced on December 12, 1979, and given on February 20, 1980.

Top Ten Films 
Manhattan
Yanks
The Europeans
The China Syndrome
Breaking Away
Apocalypse Now
Being There
Time After Time
North Dallas Forty
Kramer vs. Kramer

Top Foreign Films 
La Cage aux Folles
The Tree of Wooden Clogs
The Marriage of Maria Braun
Nosferatu the Vampyre
Peppermint Soda

Winners 
Best Film:
Manhattan
Best Foreign Film:
La Cage aux Folles
Best Actor:
Peter Sellers - Being There
Best Actress:
Sally Field - Norma Rae
Best Supporting Actor:
Paul Dooley - Breaking Away
Best Supporting Actress:
Meryl Streep - Manhattan, The Seduction of Joe Tynan, Kramer vs. Kramer
Best Director:
John Schlesinger - Yanks
Career Achievement Award:
Myrna Loy

External links 
National Board of Review of Motion Pictures :: Awards for 1979

1979
1979 film awards
1979 in American cinema